The 1981 Stella Artois Championships, also known as the Queen's Club Championships, was a men's tennis tournament played on outdoor grass courts at the Queen's Club in London in the United Kingdom that was part of the 1981 Volvo Grand Prix circuit. It was the 79th edition of the tournament and was held from 8 June until 14 June 1981. First-seeded John McEnroe won his third consecutive singles title at the event.

Finals

Singles

 John McEnroe defeated  Brian Gottfried 7–6, 7–5
 It was McEnroe's 6th singles title of the year and the 30th of his career.

Doubles

 Pat Du Pré /  Brian Teacher defeated  Kevin Curren /  Steve Denton 3–6, 7–6, 11–9
 It was Du Pré's only title of the year and the 4th of his career. It was Teacher's 3rd title of the year and the 15th of his career.

References

External links
 ITF tournament edition details
 ATP tournament profile

 
Stella Artois Championships
Queen's Club Championships
Stella Artois Championships
Stella Artois Championships
Stella Artois Championships